Charles Hicks Bustill (c.1815–1890) was an African-American abolitionist and conductor in the Underground Railroad in Philadelphia before the American Civil War. He made a living as a plasterer.

Bustill's grandfather was Cyrus Bustill and he was a member of the city's prominent Bustill family.  His children include Gertrude Bustill Mossell and Maria Louisa Bustill, mother of Paul Robeson.

References

External links
Bustill family in the Underground Railroad

African-American abolitionists
Robeson-Bustill family
1816 births
1890 deaths
Underground Railroad people